Everly may refer to:

People
 Don and Phil Everly, singers known as The Everly Brothers
 Jack Everly, American conductor and music arranger

Places
 Everly, Iowa, United States
 Everly, Seine-et-Marne, France

Other uses
 Everly (film), a 2014 film
 Everly (group), an American folk music group
 Everly (given name)

See also
 Everleigh (disambiguation)